María del Rocío Corona Nakamura (born 3 February 1964) is a Mexican politician affiliated with the PRI. She served as a deputy of the LXII Legislature of the Mexican Congress representing Jalisco.

References

1964 births
Living people
Politicians from Guadalajara, Jalisco
Women members of the Chamber of Deputies (Mexico)
Members of the Congress of Jalisco
Institutional Revolutionary Party politicians
University of Guadalajara alumni
Academic staff of the University of Guadalajara
20th-century Mexican politicians
20th-century Mexican women politicians
21st-century Mexican politicians
21st-century Mexican women politicians
Deputies of the LXII Legislature of Mexico
Members of the Chamber of Deputies (Mexico) for Jalisco